Metoubes is a town in the northern part of the Kafr El Sheikh Governorate of Egypt.

The older names of the town are Netoubes and Netoubes Al-Rumman.

See also
 List of cities and towns in Egypt

References

Populated places in Kafr El Sheikh Governorate